The Golden Road is a 1913 novel by Canadian author L. M. Montgomery.

Background

As a child, Montgomery learned many stories from her great aunt Mary Lawson.  She later used these in The Story Girl and The Golden Road. Montgomery married on July 5, 1911 and left Prince Edward Island.  She arrived at Leaskdale, Ontario in October, where her husband served as the minister of St. Paul's Presbyterian Church.  She began work on this novel on April 30, 1912, and gave birth to her first son on July 7. She finished the novel on May 21, 1913, saying "I have been too hurried and stinted for time. I have had to write it at high pressure, all the time nervously expecting some interruption". The book was published on September 1. It was dedicated to Mary Lawson.

Plot summary

The plot is based around the character Beverley who remembers his childhood days with his brother Felix and friends and cousins Felicity, Cecily, Dan, Sara Stanley (the "Story Girl"), hired-boy Peter and neighbour Sara Ray.  The children often played in their family's orchard and had many adventures, even creating their own newspaper, called Our Magazine. More character development takes place in this novel than in its predecessor and the reader is able to watch the children grow up; in particular, they are able to watch Sara Stanley leave the Golden Road of childhood forever. They also are able to see the beginnings of a relationship between Peter and Felicity, as chemistry between them starts to build; it also seems that Beverley and Sara Stanley are drawn to each other but this is left undeveloped. Throughout the story it is hinted that Beverley's cousin, Cecily, is consumptive; in a passage where the Story Girl tells their futures, the adult Beverley confirms that Cecily never left the Golden Road. As well, Beverley strongly hints that Peter and Felicity will be married. The novel ends after Sara's father collects her to give her a proper education and their small group is never complete again.

References

External links
 
 The Golden Road by L. M. Montgomery Project Gutenberg
 L.M. Montgomery Online Formerly the L.M. Montgomery Research Group, this site includes a blog, extensive lists of primary and secondary materials, detailed information about Montgomery's publishing history, and a filmography of screen adaptations of Montgomery texts. See, in particular, the page about The Golden Road.
 The Golden Road LibriVox (free audiobooks of public domain)
 L.M. Montgomery's Personal Scrapbooks and Book Covers The Confederation Centre Art Gallery
 The Story Girl and The Golden Road An L.M. Montgomery Resource Page
 The L.M. Montgomery Literary Society This site  includes information about Montgomery's works and life and research from the newsletter, The Shining Scroll.

1913 Canadian novels
Novels by Lucy Maud Montgomery
Canadian children's novels
Novels set in Prince Edward Island
1913 children's books